Leucadendron chamelaea, the Witsenberg conebush, is a flower-bearing shrub that belongs to the genus Leucadendron and forms part of the fynbos. The plant is native to the Western Cape, South Africa.

Description

Two months after the plant has flowered, the fruit appears and the seeds later fall to the ground.

Fire destroys the plant but the seeds survive. The plant is unisexual, there are male and female plants. Insects do the pollination and agriculture threatens the survival of the plant.

Distribution and habitat
The plant occurs from the Kouebokkeveld Mountains to the Franschhoek Valley.

Gallery

References

http://redlist.sanbi.org/species.php?species=794-16
http://pza.sanbi.org/leucadendron-chamelaea
https://www.proteaatlas.org.za/conebu6.htm
http://biodiversityexplorer.info/plants/proteaceae/leucadendron_chamelaea.htm

chamelaea